Settlement of English people along the Caribbean Coast, or Miskito Coast, of Nicaragua began in 1633. The area was controlled by Britain until 1860, and eventually integrated into Nicaragua by 1894. The Miskito Coast region divided into two autonomous regions within Nicaragua after 1987.

Caribbean coast 

The first English settlers of the Miskito Coast arrived in 1633, exchanging products through primitive trade with the Miskitos. The English exchanged manufactured goods such as guns, machetes, beds, mirrors etc., in exchange for cocoa, animal skins, sarsaparilla, rubber, wood, and turtle shells. The formation of an English colony in the region led Spain to protest, but England managed to create a colony on the Caribbean Coast. This colony had two different, but complementary, production methods; one a capitalist basis and the other communal. Capitalist production was based on the import of African slaves to work on sugar cane and cotton plantations, and the harvesting of Mahogany. Arguably, the English were responsible for transporting most of the African slaves that were forcibly resettled in Nicaragua. The obtained products were sold to other English colonies in North America, the Caribbean and London.

Communal production, typical of the area and strengthened by new settlers, was based on the appointment of a Miskito King. The first such King, Oldman, was appointed during the English Interregnum and continued during the reign of Charles II of England and Scotland and after the Acts of Union between England and Scotland. In 1847, the British occupied the Nicaraguan side of the Miskito Coast.

British withdrawal

In 1860 Britain and the United States signed a treaty following the development of international negotiations between the two countries. As a result, from 1894 the UK gradually ceded its territories in the region and in 1905 handed the territory to US companies. The latter occupation lasted until 1930.

After British withdrawal, the Miskito coast remained an autonomous region of Nicaragua for 44 years. It maintained its own laws and regulations until 1894, when the region was integrated into Nicaragua by President José Santos Zelaya. This developed monopolies for mestizos in the area and for US interests, and the name of the region was changed to the Department of Zelaya.

The government encouraged massive immigration of Nicaraguan mestizos, especially those engaged in military and commercial affairs, and entrepreneurs. Immigrants and Nicaraguan government officials evicted the indigenous Amerindians and Afro-descendants from their lands and imposed heavy fines on the indigenous groups living on the coast. In addition, the government abolished the region's laws by force and replaced them with Nicaraguan institutions, including the state's education, legal and governance structures.

The most important result was the prohibition of education in English and other indigenous languages such as that spoken by the Garifuna. The result was the abandonment of schools and colleges by the indigenous communities of the Miskito coast for generations. Additionally, the Nicaraguan coast remained economically dominated by US companies until the 1930s when they were gradually replaced by the capital of the Somoza family and its allies until 1979 with the triumph of the Sandinista Revolution.

In 1987 the Miskito Coast achieved autonomy from Nicaragua. In order to maintain the country's territorial integrity, the government divided the territory into two autonomous regions now known as the South Caribbean Coast Autonomous Region and the North Caribbean Coast Autonomous Region, but internal conflicts remain.

References 

Ethnic groups in Nicaragua
English diaspora
European Nicaraguan
English diaspora in North America